Philippe Castelli (8 June 1926 – 16 April 2006) was a French film actor. He appeared in 100 films between 1960 and 1992.

Selected filmography

 Les Bonnes Femmes (1960) - Le régisseur
 Wise Guys (1961) - Le portier au vernissage (uncredited)
 Cartouche (1962) - Le commissaire (uncredited)
 The Elusive Corporal (1962) - Le prisonnier électricien
 À fleur de peau (1962) - Kleber
 Landru (1963) - Un inspecteur de police
 Les Bricoleurs (1963) - Le facteur
 Carom Shots (1963) - Le portier du 321 (uncredited)
 The Bread Peddler (1963) - Le premier policier aux ordres du préfet de police
 Les Tontons flingueurs (1963) - Le tailleur
 Une ravissante idiote (1964) - Le client du restaurant Lion's (uncredited)
 Dandelions by the Roots (1964) - L'interne (uncredited)
 Aimez-vous les femmes? (1964) - Un adepte de la secte
 Les durs à cuire ou Comment supprimer son prochain sans perdre l'appétit (1964) - Le critique (uncredited)
 Une souris chez les hommes (1964) - Le gardien du Louvre (uncredited)
 Jaloux comme un tigre (1964) - Le policier du constat (uncredited)
 Patate (1964) - Le facteur (uncredited)
 La grande frousse (1964) - Le journaliste photographe (uncredited)
 Male Companion (1964) - L'homme qui trompe Balthazar (uncredited)
 Fantômas (1964) - L'agent en faction (uncredited)
 The Great Spy Chase (1964) - Le portier d'Istanbul / The Porter in Istanbul
 Yo Yo (1965) - Le domestique
 Quand passent les faisans (1965) - Le barman (uncredited)
 Les Bons Vivants (1965) - Boudu (segment "Bons vivants, Les") (uncredited)
 Fantômas se déchaîne (1965) - L'inspecteur en retard (uncredited)
 La sentinelle endormie (1966) - Un grognard
 Galia (1966) - L'homme au téléphone
 Monnaie de singe (1966) - Le clochard
 Ne nous fâchons pas (1966) - (uncredited)
 Your Money or Your Life (1966) - Le maître fromager (uncredited)
 Les enquiquineurs (1966)
 The Night of the Generals (1967) - French Forensic Physician (uncredited)
 La grande lessive (1968) - Tamanoir, un technicien OVTF
 Borsalino (1970) - Le garçon d'hôtel (uncredited)
 Promise at Dawn (1970) - Crew Member
 Laisse aller... c'est une valse (1971) - Le directeur de la prison
 Easy, Down There! (1971) - Le grand vicaire
 Le drapeau noir flotte sur la marmite (1971) - Chef de gare
 Le viager (1972) - L'artiste de cabaret
 Chut! (1972) - Le ministre
 La classe du sexe (1973) - Le journaliste
 Quelques messieurs trop tranquilles (1973) - Récitant / Le reporter
 Les volets clos (1973)
 Les quatre Charlots mousquetaires (1974)
 Un amour de pluie (1974) - Le portier
 Deux grandes filles dans un pyjama (1974) - L'avocat (uncredited)
 Icy Breasts (1974) - L'homme dans le parking souterrain
 Les Charlots en folie: À nous quatre Cardinal! (1974)
 Borsalino & Co. (1974) - Le coiffeur (uncredited)
 Sexuellement vôtre (1974) - Le majordome
 Le bordel, 1ère époque; 1900 (1974) - Le sous-préfet
 Les bidasses s'en vont en guerre (1974) - L'huissier
 Soldat Duroc, ça va être ta fête! (1975) - Le colonel
 Couche-moi dans le sable et fais jaillir ton pétrole... (1975) - Le mort
 Cher Victor (1975) - Le neveu
 C'est dur pour tout le monde (1975) - For Ever #1
 Bons baisers de Hong Kong (1975) - Le policier à la circulation
 La grande récré (1976) - Un Promoteur
 Man in a Hurry (1977) - L'ami du ministre (uncredited)
 Death of a Corrupt Man (1977) - Le buraliste (uncredited)
 Black-Out (1977) - Le bousculé
 On peut le dire sans se fâcher (1978)
 One Two Two (1978) - Béret français
 Ils sont fous ces sorciers (1978)
 Victims of Vice (Brigade mondaine) (1978) - Le maître d'hôtel
 Judith Therpauve (1978) - Huissier de rédaction
 Le cavaleur (1979) - Marcel
 Le temps des vacances (1979) - Lemaître d'hôtel d'Alexandre
 Cop or Hood (1979) - L'examinateur au permis de conduire
 Brigade mondaine: La secte de Marrakech (1979) - Le monsieur distingué
 The Wonderful Day (1980) - Le concierge
 Les aventures de Guidon Fûté (1980) - L'homme qui se cure le nez
 Une merveilleuse journée (1980) - Le constipé
 Est-ce bien raisonnable? (1981) - L'appariteur
 Signé Furax (1981) - Un agent au barrage
 Prends ta rolls et va pointer (1981) - Pérol, le propriétaire du pavillon
 Le jour se lève et les conneries commencent (1981) - Maurice
 Pour la peau d'un flic (1981) - Jean le barman
 On s'en fout... nous on s'aime (1982) - Le professeur de français
 Plus beau que moi, tu meurs (1982) - Père Eusébio
 Le Battant (1983) - Nestor, réceptionniste hôtel Trianon
 Ça va pas être triste (1983) - Ludovick
 The Secret of the Selenites (1983) - Lundi (voice)
 Retenez Moi...Ou Je Fais Un Malheur (1984) - Le brigadier
 Rebelote (1984) - L'instituteur
 Aldo et Junior (1984) - Gaston
 Ave Maria (1984) - Gustave Leone
 Par où t'es rentré ? On t'a pas vu sortir (1984) - Grégori
 Liberté, égalité, choucroute (1985) - Docteur Guillotin
 Banana's boulevard (1986) - L'employé de l'ANPE
 À deux minutes près (1989) - Le garçon de la brasserie

External links

1926 births
2006 deaths
Burials at Montmartre Cemetery
French male film actors
20th-century French male actors